Surp Hovhannes (Armenian: Սուրբ ՅովհաննԷս Եկեղեցի; meaning Saint John) or Voskevaz Church (Armenian: Ոսկեվազ եկեղեցի) is a 7th- to 12th-century basilica located in the village of Voskevaz in the Aragatsotn Province of Armenia.

Architecture 
The church of S. Hovhannes is a large cruciform central plan interior and rectangular exterior plan type basilica. It is missing the drum and dome that once stood above. Two portals lead into the church. Much of the church is void of any decoration.

Renovation 
The structure is currently (as of late 2009) being renovated and parts are being reconstructed.

Gallery

References

Bibliography

External links 

Christian monasteries in Armenia
Armenian Apostolic churches in Armenia
Tourist attractions in Aragatsotn Province
Churches in Aragatsotn Province
12th-century Oriental Orthodox church buildings
12th-century churches in Armenia
7th-century churches in Armenia